Sigeric I of Essex was a King of Essex, and a son of Saelred of Essex, reigning from an unknown date until he abdicated and went on pilgrimage to Rome in 798.  Like his predecessors, he recognised Mercian overlordship.

References

External links
 

East Saxon monarchs
8th-century English monarchs